Pasteral Reservoir is a reservoir located on the Ter river, on the border between La Cellera de Ter and Amer, Catalonia, Spain. The reservoir has a storage capacity of 233 hm³ and the dam has a structural height of 33 m and a crest length of 150 m.

See also
List of dams and reservoirs in Catalonia

References

External links
Presa del Pasteral in Consorci del Ter website 
La Cellera de Ter Official Website 
Amer Official Website 

Reservoirs in Catalonia
Selva